Philostorgius (368 – c. 439 AD) was an Anomoean Church historian of the 4th and 5th centuries.

Very little information about his life is available. He was born in Borissus, Cappadocia to Eulampia and Carterius, and lived in Constantinople from the age of twenty. He is said to have come from an Arian family, and in Constantinople soon attached himself to Eunomius of Cyzicus, who received much praise from Philostorgius in his work.

He wrote a history of the Arian controversy titled Church History (Ἐκκλησιαστικὴ ἱστορία, Ekklēsiastikē Historia). Philostorgius' original appeared between 425 and 433, in other words, slightly earlier than the History of Socrates of Constantinople, and was formed in twelve volumes bound in two books. The original is now lost. However, one copy was found by the ninth-century historian Photius, in his library in Constantinople, who wrote an epitome of it. Others also borrowed from Philostorgius, most notably the author of the Artemii Passio (Artemius being a legendary martyr under Julian the Apostate), and so, despite the eventual disappearance of the original text, it is possible to form some idea of what it contained by reviewing the epitome and other references. This reconstruction of what might have been in the text was first published, in German, by the Belgian philologist Joseph Bidez in 1913; a third, revised edition of his work undertaken by Friedhelm Winkelmann was published in 1981; this edition has recently been translated into English by Philip R. Amidon.

He also wrote a treatise against Porphyry, which is completely lost.

Editions
 Bruno Bleckmann, Markus Stein (ed.): Philostorgios Kirchengeschichte (= Kleine und fragmentarische Historiker der Spätantike E 7). 2 vols. Ferdinand Schöningh, Paderborn 2015, . 
 Philostorgius, Kirchengeschichte. Mit dem Leben des Lucian von Antiochien und den Fragmenten eines arianischen Historiographen, edited by Joseph Bidez and revised by Friedhelm Winkelmann, GCS (Berlin: Akademie-Verlag, 1981).
 Philostorgius Church History, editor and translator Philip R. Amidon, S.J. (Atlanta: Society of Biblical Literature, 2007).
 Photios, Epitome of the Ecclesiastical History of Philostorgius, tr Edward Walford, (London: Henry G. Bonn, 1855)

References

Further reading
Studies
 Bruno Bleckmann, "Apokalypse und kosmische Katastrophen: Das Bild der theodosianischen Dynastie beim Kirchenhistoriker Philostorg," in Brandes, Wolfram / Schmieder, Felicitas (hg), Endzeiten. Eschatologie in den monotheistischen Weltreligionen (Berlin, de Gruyter, 2008) (Millennium-Studien / Millennium Studies / Studien zu Kultur und Geschichte des ersten Jahrtausends n. Chr. / Studies in the Culture and History of the First Millennium C.E., 16), 13–40.

External links
 Epitome of the Ecclesiastical History of Philostorgius from The Tertullian Project.
__notoc__

368 births
430s deaths
4th-century Christians
4th-century Romans
5th-century Byzantine historians
5th-century Christians
4th-century Byzantine historians
Christian writers